The 1949–50 season was the 66th Scottish football season in which Dumbarton competed at national level, entering the Scottish Football League, the Scottish Cup, the Scottish League Cup and the Supplementary Cup.  In addition Dumbarton competed in the Stirlingshire Cup.

Scottish League

If the 1948-49 league campaign was a disappointment, this season was to prove a disaster, with just 16 points being won and a 15th-place finish - a distant 31 behind champions Morton.  Things might have been worse, however, with only 4 points separating them from relegation to Division C.

Scottish Cup

Dumbarton lost out in the second round of the Cup to Stirling Albion, after two drawn games.

Scottish League Cup

With two wins and a draw being taken from their 6 games in the sectional games of the League Cup, Dumbarton finished 3rd of 4 and failed to qualify for the next stage.

Supplementary Cup
It was a first round exit in the B Division Cup, this time to Stenhousemuir.

Stirlingshire Cup
Alloa were to prove too strong for Dumbarton in the first round clash of the county cup.

Benefit Matches
Two 'benefit' matches were played against strong Rangers and Clyde sides, resulting in wins in both cases.

Player statistics

|}

Source:

Transfers

Players in

Players out 

Source:

Reserve team
Dumbarton played a reserve team for the first time in many seasons and competed in Division C (South West) finishing 18th and bottom, recording 6 wins and 8 draws from 34 matches.  Note that in addition to the reserve sides of the bigger Division A teams in South and West Scotland, the first team of Stranraer also competed in this league.

In the Second XI Cup, Dumbarton were dumped out in the first round by Queen of the South.

References

Dumbarton F.C. seasons
Scottish football clubs 1949–50 season